Kane Farrell (born 17 March 1999) is a professional Australian rules footballer playing for  in the Australian Football League (AFL). He made his debut in round 19 of the 2018 AFL season against the Western Bulldogs at Eureka Stadium, kicking one goal.

Farrell grew up in Castlemaine, Victoria supporting the Geelong Cats. He played junior football with Winters Flat in their under-10s team through to their under-15s team. Farrell then played for Castlemaine Football Club and the Bendigo Pioneers' under-15s, 16s and 18s teams. He represented Vic Country in the 2017 AFL Under 18 Championships, averaging 14 possessions and three marks per game. At the 2017 AFL Draft Combine, Farrell recorded the equal-best time of 8.10 seconds in the agility test and the second-best  sprint with a time of 2.90 seconds. He was drafted by Port Adelaide with their second selection (no. 51 overall) in the 2017 national draft. Farrell inherited number 24 from Jarman Impey.

Farrell was named in Port Adelaide's 2018 AFLX squad. Before his AFL debut, he played 13 matches in the South Australian National Football League, kicking 20 goals. Farrell was named as an emergency for the senior side in the two weeks before his first match. Ahead of his debut, Port Adelaide development coach Aaron Greaves described him as a "lovely left foot" and a "classy finisher".

Farrell's parents are Sue and Stephen. He has one brother, Brodie.

References

External links 

 
 

Living people
1999 births
People from Castlemaine, Victoria
Castlemaine Football Club players
Bendigo Pioneers players
Port Adelaide Football Club players
Port Adelaide Football Club players (all competitions)
Port Adelaide Magpies players
Australian rules footballers from Victoria (Australia)